Aparna Balamurali (born 11 September 1995) is an Indian actress who primarily works in Malayalam films, in addition to Tamil films. She is known for her roles in Maheshinte Prathikaaram (2016), Sunday Holiday (2017) and Soorarai Pottru (2020). For the last of these, she won the National Film Award for Best Actress in 2021.

Personal life
Aparna was born in Thrissur, Kerala, India to KP Balamurali, a music director and Shobha Balamurali . She completed her schooling at Devamatha CMI Public School.

Career
Aparna made her acting debut in the Malayalam film Yathra Thudarunnu (2013) along with Lakshmi Gopalaswamy, directed by Jayan Sivapuram. In 2015, her movie Oru Second Class Yathra was released. She rose to fame with her film named, Maheshinte Prathikaaram in 2016. She also starred in comedy Oru Muthassi Gada (2016). She made her Tamil debut in 8 Thottakkal (2017). She played in Sunday Holiday (2017) and  Thrissivaperoor Kliptham (2017).  In both films, she is paired opposite Asif Ali. Besides this, she also pursued her career in Music and gave songs like Mounangal Mindumoree, Thennal Nilavinte and Thanthane. Her 2018 releases are Kamuki and B. Tech. She has been cast as the Tamil film's heroine in Sarvam Thaala Mayam (2019) starring G. V. Prakash Kumar. Her subsequent films in Malayalam were Mr. & Ms. Rowdy (2019) and Jeem Boom Bhaa (2019). She appeared as Bommi in Suriya starrer Soorarai Pottru (2020). The next Tamil movie was Theethum Nandrum (2021).

Filmography

Other works

Discography

Awards and nominations

References

External links
 
 

1995 births
Living people
Indian film actresses
Actresses in Malayalam cinema
Actresses in Tamil cinema
Actresses in Tamil television
Actresses from Thrissur
Best Actress National Film Award winners
21st-century Indian actresses
Singers from Thrissur
Malayalam playback singers
Indian women playback singers
21st-century Indian women singers
21st-century Indian singers